Flinton is a village and an unincorporated community in Cambria County, Pennsylvania, United States. Flinton has a post office with ZIP code 16640.

Geography

References

Unincorporated communities in Cambria County, Pennsylvania
Unincorporated communities in Pennsylvania